Dream Street is the second studio album by American musician Janet Jackson, released on October 23, 1984, by A&M Records. More pop than her debut album's "bubblegum soul" feel, the album was not the runaway success that Janet's father Joseph thought it would be, peaking at No. 147 on the Billboard 200 in 1984. The album did have one modest hit for Jackson, the Top 10 R&B single, "Don't Stand Another Chance", produced by brother Marlon. Also, the video for the song "Dream Street", her first music video, was shot during the shooting of the TV show Fame.

Critical reception

With a two-out-of-five star rating, Ed Hogan with AllMusic  commented retrospectively, saying "A listen to Janet Jackson's Dream Street brings to mind remembrances of the then-teenaged singer's appearances on American Bandstand [...] The first single, "Don't Stand Another Chance," was a family affair, produced by brother Marlon Jackson with vocal ad-libs by Michael Jackson. It was a Top Ten R&B hit during the summer of 1984. The extended 12" mix rocks, showcasing outstanding synth work by John Barnes. Other standouts are the smeary Minneapolis funk cut "Pretty Boy" produced by Jesse Johnson, and both "Hold Back the Tears" and "If It Takes All Night" are prime examples of pleasing '80s pop."

Ken Tucker with The Philadelphia Inquirer gave it a "fair" rating, calling it "A small but pleasant surprise: The Jacksons' youngest sister has come up with a more consistently entertaining album than her brothers' Victory record. Most Dream Street songs have a glossy pop sheen, and Janet's duet with English pop star Cliff Richard, "Two to the Power of Love," is catchy, if totally forgettable. Most of the time Janet favors slick disco rhythms that are easy to listen to."

Commercial performance
Dream Street sold  21,320 copies between 1991 and April 2007 according to Nielsen Soundscan, while its sales through the BMG Music Club stand at 44,000 as of 2003. But the majority of the sales occurred before Soundscan began tracking sales in the US in 1991. The album peaked at 147 in the United States and failed to chart internationally.

Dream Street is both the lowest charting studio album of Janet Jackson's career in the US, and her only studio album to not spawn any hits on the Billboard Hot 100 chart.

Track listing

A song called "Start Anew" was written for the album by Ralph McCarthy, Yuji Toriyama, but was not included on the track list. It was released as an off-album single in Japan on October 11, 1985, with the B-sides "Hold Back the Tears" (7") and an extended version (12"). The song was later included on the Japanese edition of Control.

Charts

Personnel
Adapted from AllMusic.

 Janet Jackson – duet, lead vocals
 Beth Andersen – background vocals
 John Barnes – associate producer,   drum programming, keyboards, Moog bass, Moog synthesizer, programming, rhythm, rhythm arrangements
 Arthur Barrow – arranger, bass guitar, keyboards
 Steve Bates – engineer
 Chuck Beeson – art direction
 Pete Bellotte –   producer
 Bill Bottrell – engineer, mixing
 Sam Emerson – inlay photography, photography
 Dino Espinosa – background vocals
 Michael Espinosa – background vocals
 Tito Espinosa – background vocals
 Gary Falcone – background vocals
 Mitchell Froom – arranger, keyboards
 Brian Gardner – mastering
 Steve Hodge – engineer
 Jackie Jackson – background vocals
 Marlon Jackson – drum programming, drums, producer, programming, rhythm, rhythm arrangements, background vocals
 Michael Jackson – background vocals
 Tito Jackson – background vocals
 Jesse Johnson – producer
 Marva King – background vocals
 Harry Langdon – cover photo
 Peter Martinsen – engineer, mixing, remixing
 Peggy McCreary – mixing
 Jonathan Moffett – drums
 Giorgio Moroder – producer
 Melanie Nissen – design
 Cecille Parker – stylist
 Anthony Patler –   keyboards, rhythm, rhythm arrangements
 Greg Phillinganes – keyboards, Moog bass, Moog synthesizer
 Joe Pizzulo – background vocals
 Brian Reeves – mixdown engineer, mixing
 Cliff Richard – duet, vocals
 John Philip Shenale – arranger, keyboards
 Jeremy Smith – engineer, mixing
 Julia Tillman Waters – background vocals
 Maxine Willard Waters – background vocals
 Richie Zito – guitar

References

External links
Dream Street Image Page at *
You Don't Stand Another Chance at YouTube

1984 albums
A&M Records albums
Janet Jackson albums
Albums produced by Giorgio Moroder
Albums produced by Pete Bellotte